A list of adventure films released before the 1920s.

References